Gideon Jacques Denny (1830–1886) was a marine artist who was born in Wilmington, Delaware on July 15, 1830.  As a young man, he worked on ships in the Chesapeake Bay.  He traveled to California in 1849 with the Gold Rush.  He worked as a teamster on the San Francisco docks and was a member of the San Francisco Committee of Vigilance. After two years in California, he moved to Milwaukee, where he studied painting with Samuel Marsden Brookes. After six years of study in Milwaukee, Denny returned to San Francisco and established a studio on Bush Street.  In 1862, Brookes moved to San Francisco and shared a studio with Denny.  In 1868, Denny spent two months in Hawaii visiting several islands.  He is also known to have visited Canada and South America.  Denny died of malaria in Cambria, California on Oct. 7, 1886.

The Berkeley Art Museum and Pacific Film Archive, the Bishop Museum (Honolulu), the Crocker Art Museum (Sacramento, California), the Fine Arts Museums of San Francisco, Monterey Peninsula Museum of Art, and the Oakland Museum of California are among the public collections holding works by Gideon Jacques Denny.

References
 Hughes, Edan, Artists in California 1786-1940, Sacramento, Crocker Art Museum, 2002.
 Severson, Don R. Finding Paradise: Island Art in Private Collections, University of Hawaii Press, 2002, p. 80.

External links

 Smithsonian American Art Museum, Art Inventories Catalog
 Gideon Jacques Denny on AskArt.com

Footnotes

1830 births
1886 deaths
19th-century American painters
American male painters
American marine artists
Artists from Hawaii
Painters from California
Artists from Wilmington, Delaware
Artists from San Francisco
19th-century American male artists